Alex Fong Chung-sun (born 17 March 1963) is a Hong Kong actor. He married actress Hoyan Mok in 2008; they have one daughter.

Incidents
Fong has been a brand representative of DOXA, a brand of watches since 2008. In the opening ceremony of DOXA's flagship store in Guangzhou, Fong was sexually harassed by another female guest of the event. DOXA issued an open declaration stating Fong's under-performing had harmed the image of the brand, and therefore they terminated the arrangement. Mani Fok, the representative of the artist management that Fong belonged to, explicitly said that the issues involve some requirements which were outside the signed contract as a brand representative.

Filmography

Film

19?? Sea Killer
1986 Escape From Coral Cove
1987 Iron Angels
1987 Life Is A Moment's Story
1988 The Story of Haybo
1988 Iron Angels 2
1989 What A Small World
1989 Iron Angels 3
1990 Sleazy Dizzy
1990 Blood Stained Tradewind
1990 Fire Phoenix
1990 Forsaken Cop
1990 The Dragon Fighter
1990 Enhanced Romance
1990 Magic Amethyst
1991 Thunder Run
1991 Lethal Panther
1991 Gigolo And Whore
1991 Pretty Woman
1991 The Killer From China
1991 Devil Cat
1991 Devil And Master
1991 The Plot
1992 Secret Police
1992 Escape From Brothel
1992 Behind the Pink Door
1992 The Beauty's Evil Roses
1992 Battle in Hell
1992 Raiders of Loesing Treasure
1992 Club Girl's Romance
1992 Guys in Ghost's Hand
1992 Ghost Killer
1992 The Mighty Gambler
1992 Gigolo and Whore II
1992 Rover Killer And Madame
1993 The Invincible Constable
1993 Angel of The Road
1993 Fatal Seduction
1993 Angel of Vengeance (Miao jie shi san mei)
1993 Guns of Dragon
1994 Love Sick
1994 He And She
1994 Love Recipe
1994 Beyond The Copline
1994 Blaze of Love
1995 Heart Stealer
1995 Dream Killer
1995 Hard Touching
1996 A Moment of Romance 3
1997 Lifeline
1997 Downtown Torpedoes
1997 We're No Bad Guys
1998 Cheap Killers
1998 Till Death Do Us Part
1998 Raped by an Angel 3: Sexual Fantasy of The Chief Executive
1998 Your Place or Mine!
1998 A True Mob Story
1998 Portland Street Blues
1998 Casino
1998 The Storm Riders
1999 Rules of the Game
1999 Red Rain
2000 When I Fall in Love...With Both
2000 Double Tap
2000 Eternal Love
2001 The Cheaters
2001 City of Desire
2001 Sharp Guns
2002 Devil Touch
2003 The Death Curse
2003 My Lucky Star
2004 Explosive City
2004 Cop Unbowed
2004 One Nite in Mongkok
2004 Astonishing
2005 Crazy'n The City
2005 Mob Sister
2005 Drink-Drank-Drunk
2005 Home Sweet Home
2006 Don't Open Your Eyes
2006 Heavenly Mission
2007 Big Movie
2008 Esquire Runway
2008 All About Women
2008 If You Are the One
2009 Overheard
2010 Blue Cornflower
2010 Just Another Pandora's Box
2010 Once a Gangster
2010 Triple Tap
2010 To Love or Not
2010 Love Is The Last Word
2011 Be a Mother
2011 The Lost Bladesman
2011 The Founding of a Party
2011 Overheard 2
2012 The Great Magician
2013 Timeless Love
2013 Mark of Youth
2013 Love in Langzhong
2014 Overheard 3
2014 One Step Away
2014 Kung Fu Jungle
2015 Insanity
2015 Paris Holiday
2015 I Am Somebody
2016 Perfect Imperfection
2018 Project Gutenberg
2018 Source of Dreams
2018 Kung Fu Monster
2019 Integrity
2019 First Class Charge
2019 Dirty on Duty
TBD Be Water, My Friend
TBD The Goldfinger

Television

1992 Crime Fighters
1993 Eternity
1994 The Intangible Truth
1994 Corruption Doesn't Pay (with Esther Kwan)
1995 ICAC Investigators
1996 Before Dawn
1996 A Woman's Story
1997 Interpol
1998 The Business
1999 Wind Cloud Changes
1999 Love Is in the Air
2000 Showbiz Tycoon
2001 Money Game
2002 Just in Time for the Wedding
2002 Burning Flame II
2003 Love and Again
2003 Life Begins at Forty
2003 Crime Fighters　
2004 Crime Investigators 2004
2004 Split Second
2005 Endless Love
2005 Legend of Hero
2005 Phoenix From The Ashes
2006 Fox Volant of the Snowy Mountain
2006 Love's New Breath
2006 Dreams Link
2006 C'est La Vie, Mon Chéri
2007 The Building Blocks of Life
2009 The Last Night of Madam Chin
2011 A Great Way to Care
2013 A Great Way to Care II
2015 The Legend of Mi Yue 
2016 Law dis-Order
 2018 Siege in Fog
2019 Begonia Rouge
2019 Police Tatical Unit

Television
1992 Till Death, Do Us Part
1992 Passions Across Two Time Life
1993 Can't Stop Loving You ("Ai dao jin tou")
1994 A Story of Two Drifters
1995 Last Dance
2002 The Healing Spirit

Music video appearances
1994 Charlie Yeung's 猶豫不決
2004 Kelly Chen's 前所未見

Awards and nominations

References

External links
 
 loveHKfilm entry
 

Hong Kong male television actors
1963 births
Living people
Macau emigrants to Hong Kong
Hong Kong male film actors
20th-century Hong Kong male actors
21st-century Hong Kong male actors
TVB actors
Macau-born Hong Kong artists